Latifur Rahman (1 March 1936 – 6 June 2017) was the 10th Chief Justice and the 2nd Chief Adviser of Bangladesh.

Early life and education
Rahman was born in Jessore on 1 March 1936. His father was the lawyer Khan Bahadur Lutfur Rahman. His maternal uncle Nurul Huda served as a High Court judge. He earned his master's in English literature at the University of Dhaka in 1956 and later completed his bachelor's in law from the same university. He served as a faculty member of Shahid Suhrawardy College.

Career
Rahman started his lawyer career with the Dhaka High Court membership in 1960. He was an apprentice to Bangladesh's first attorney general MH Khandaker. He became a permanent High Court judge in 1981 and an Appellate Division judge on January 15, 1990.

Rahman became the Chief Justice on 1 January 2000 and retired from the position on 28 February 2001. He was the chief adviser of the caretaker government from 15 July 2001 to 10 October 2001 which oversaw the eighth parliamentary election in Bangladesh.

Rahman died at Samorita Hospital in Dhaka on 6 June 2017.

Publication
 "Tattabadhayak Sarkarer Dinguli O Amar Katha (The Days of the Caretaker Government and My Account)" (2014)

References

|-

1936 births
2017 deaths
People from Jessore District
University of Dhaka alumni
Supreme Court of Bangladesh justices
Chief justices of Bangladesh
Burials at Banani Graveyard